The 2011 Team Speedway Junior European Championship was the fourth UEM Team Speedway Junior European Championship season. The Final will be place on August 20 2011 in Lendava, Slovenia. Defending Champion are Poland team. The champion title was won by Russia team (42 points) who beat Denmark (36 pts), Sweden (26 pts) and an Adria Team, join team of Croatia and Slovakia (16 pts).

Results 

Because SF Two date was postponed from Saturday to Sunday, defending champion, Poland team was withdrew from the competition by Polish Motor Union (Sunday is date of the Polish Speedway Ekstraliga play-off matches). Poland was replaced by "Europe Team" (Latvia and Russia).

Heat details

Semi-Final One 
6 August 2011
  Eskilstuna, Örebro County
Smedstadion Eskilstuna (Length: 335 m)
Referee and Jury President:  Jesper Steentoft
References:

Semi-Final Two 
7 August 2011
  Chervonohrad, Lviv Oblast
Girnuk Stadium (Length: 365 m)
Referee Jury President:  Wojciech Grodzki
References:

The Final 
20 August 2011
  Lendava, Prekmurje
Športni Park Petršovci Pri Lendavi (Length: 398 m)
Referee:  Susanne Hüttinger
Jury President:  B. Thomsen
References:

See also 
 2011 Team Speedway Junior World Championship
 2011 Individual Speedway Junior European Championship

References 

2011
European Team Junior